Günther Dehn (18 April 1882 in Schwerin, Germany – 17 March 1970 in Bonn) was a German pastor and theologian. He was an illegal instructor in the Confessing Church, and, after 1945, he was a professor of practical theology. Dehn was one of the first victims of Nazi campaigns against critical intellectuals in the Weimar Republic. He was a Christian socialist in the tradition of Christoph Blumhardt, Hermann Kutter, and Leonhard Ragaz.

Further reading
 Friedrich Wilhelm Bautz: Dehn, Günther. In: Biographisch-Bibliographisches Kirchenlexikon (BBKL). Band 1, Bautz, Hamm 1975. 2., unveränderte Auflage Hamm 1990, Sp. 1242–1248.
 Friedemann Stengel: Wer vertrieb Günther Dehn (1882–1970) aus Halle? In: Zeitschrift für Kirchengeschichte, 114 (3), Kohlhammer, Stuttgart 2003, ISSN 0044-2925
 Raimund Hoenen: Günther Dehn (1882–1970) – Außenseiter für Frieden. In: Arno Sames (Hrsg.): 500 Jahre Theologie in Wittenberg und Halle 1502–2002. Beiträge aus der Theologischen Fakultät der Martin-Luther-Universität Halle-Wittenberg zum Universitätsjubiläum 2002. LStRLO 6, Leipzig 2003
 Rüdiger Weyer: Günther Dehn. In: derselbe: Kirche – Staat – Gesellschaft in Autobiographien des Kirchenkampfes. Nachwort: Martin Stöhr, Spenner, Waltrop 1997, S. 190–203

20th-century German Protestant theologians
German male non-fiction writers
German resistance to Nazism
Nazi Germany and Protestantism
1882 births
1970 deaths
Protestants in the German Resistance
German Christian socialists